Redbridge Community School is a mixed secondary school in west Southampton, Hampshire, in the south of England.

The school previously held specialist school status as Sports College. Today it is a foundation school administered by Southampton City Council and the Reach Cooperative Trust.

References 

 http://www.redbridgeschool.org.uk/_includes/prospectus/index.html#/10/
 http://www.redbridgeschool.org.uk/page/default.asp?title=Home&pid=1

External links
 The school's website
 Learning Futures website
 The school on Ofsted's website
  School Prospectus

Secondary schools in Southampton
Foundation schools in Southampton